Se Hazar River is a river of northern Iran. It flows through the Alborz mountain range, eventually combining with the Do Hezar before flowing into the Caspian Sea as the Cheshmeh Kileh River.

See also

Central Alborz mountain range map

Rivers of Mazandaran Province
Alborz (mountain range)
Tributaries of the Cheshmeh Kileh River